Aloysius Richard Lujack (October 5, 1920 – December 26, 2002) was an American professional basketball player. He spent one season in the Basketball Association of America (BAA) as a member of the Washington Capitols. He attended Georgetown University, where he played on the football, basketball, and track and field teams.

Al's younger brother, Johnny Lujack, won the Heisman Trophy in 1947 while playing football for Notre Dame.

BAA career statistics

Regular season

External links

1920 births
2002 deaths
American men's basketball players
Basketball players from Pennsylvania
Forwards (basketball)
Georgetown Hoyas football players
Georgetown Hoyas men's basketball players
Georgetown Hoyas men's track and field athletes
People from Bethesda, Maryland
Place of birth missing
Washington Capitols players